Iron Chef Vietnam (Vietnamese: Siêu Đầu Bếp Việt Nam) is a Vietnamese cooking show based on the Japanese show Iron Chef, as well as its American adaptation Iron Chef America and The Next Iron Chef. The program is a sort of culinary game show, with each episode seeing a challenger chef competing against one of the resident "Iron Chefs" in a one-hour cooking competition using a theme ingredient.

The show was put into production by the Vietnam Television mainly to rival to MasterChef Vietnam currently in pre-production. The show is produced mainly by TV Plus with support of Vietnam Television. It is initially scheduled to premiere on Sunday April 22, 2012 at 11:00AM slot on VTV3, but delayed to May 6 at the same slot. Expectedly, Martin Yan joined the set and showed some cooking tips.

Overview
Iron Chef Vietnam features production design and presentation similar to Iron Chef America. The challenger is introduced at the beginning of the show and selects an Iron Chef to compete against. The battle takes place in the studio kitchen arena. Each chef is assisted by two sous chefs. Each chef must complete five dishes in one hour featuring a secret theme ingredient. The show features commentary throughout the event, with frequent interviews with the chefs and judges at several points in each battle. Once the battle has concluded, the judging panel tastes and delivers their critique of the food, and score the chefs based on taste, presentation and creativity.

As some challengers (and some Iron Chefs) do not speak fluent Vietnamese, their voices are dubbed. Most of the non-Vietnamese-speaking challengers speak in English (although this may also not be their native language).

Similar to the Australian counterpart, the show features a static judging panel composed of food critics Chef Dương Huy Khải, cuisine expert Phan Tôn Tịnh Hải and a guest celebrity each week. The programme is hosted by former male model Bình Minh, with additional commentary provided by Nguyên Khang and Thanh Tùng. Martin Yan (from Yan Can Cook), former model Thúy Hạnh, director Lê Hoàng, Miss Hùng Temple Giáng My, food critics Võ Quốc, designer Mai Lâm, Miss Kim Oanh, etc. are notable guest judges each week.

The Iron Chefs

Season 1

Season 2

Results

Season 1: 2012

Season 2: 2013

The Next Iron Chef Vietnam
The Next Iron Chef Vietnam was a spinoff just like Iron Chef America. It premiered on November 18, 2012, a week after Iron Chef Vietnam ended the series.

References

External links
List of television programmes broadcast by Vietnam Television (VTV)
 The official site of Iron Chef Vietnam
 Iron Chef Vietnam on Facebook page
 The official channel of Iron Chef Vietnam on ZingTV

Vietnam Television original programming
Reality television spin-offs
Vietnamese reality television series
2010s Vietnamese television series
2012 Vietnamese television series debuts
Vietnam
Non-Japanese television series based on Japanese television series